The 2014–15 Houston Baptist Huskies men's basketball team represented Houston Baptist University in the 2014–15 NCAA Division I men's basketball season. The season was head coach Ron Cottrell's twenty-fourth season at HBU. The Huskies played their home games at the Sharp Gymnasium. They are members of the Southland Conference.

The Huskies were picked to finish thirteenth (13th) in the Southland Conference Coaches' Poll and tied for twelfth (12th) in the Sports Information Director's Poll.  The team ended the season with a 12–16 overall record and a 7–11 record in conference play tied for eighth place.  Due to APR penalties, they were not eligible for postseason play, including the Southland Tournament.

Off Season
In May, Houston Baptist was informed that the men's basketball team would not be eligible for postseason play for failure to achieve NCAA APR standards. The team also has reduced practice from six days per week down to five per week and will be allowed only 16 hours of practice time a week instead of the normal 20 hours per week. The Houston Baptist men's basketball program was one of nine programs that did not meet the APR standards.

Media
All Houston Baptist games will be broadcast online live by Legacy Sports Network (LSN). LSN will also provide online video for every non-televised Huskies home game. However HBU games can air on ESPN3 as part of the Southland Conference TV packages.

Roster

Schedule and results

|-
!colspan=12 style="background:#002366; color:#FF7F00;"|Non-Conference Schedule

|-
!colspan=12 style="background:#002366; color:#FF7F00;"|Conference Schedule

See also
2014–15 Houston Baptist Huskies women's basketball team

References

Houston Christian Huskies men's basketball seasons
Houston Baptist
Houston Baptist Huskies basketball
Houston Baptist Huskies basketball